Marsilio Landriani (Milan, 1751 – Vienna, 1815) was an Italian chemist, physicist and meteorologist. He became known with his first book,   (Physical investigations on the salubrity of air), published in 1775. In it he described a new instrument, the eudiometer, which was later improved by Volta with the addition of spark wires. From 1776 he held the chair of experimental physics in the Brera Ginnasio (College). In 1781 he published his second book,  (Physical-chemical pamphlets), which contributed to opening a new way to the theory of acidity.

Between 1787 and 1788 Guyton de Morveau and Antoine-Laurent Lavoisier tried to convince Landriani to change over to the new chemistry, but he never was able to decide between phlogiston and oxygen. After 1790 he dealt exclusively with chemical applications of electric phenomena, and the improvement of physics and meteorology instruments. During his career he enjoyed a popularity comparable only to that of Alessandro Volta and Lazzaro Spallanzani, of all Italian scientists of that time.

References 

1751 births
1815 deaths
Scientists from Milan
18th-century Italian chemists
18th-century Italian physicists
Italian meteorologists